Osteolepis (from   'bone' and   'scale') is an extinct genus of lobe-finned fish from the Devonian period. It lived in the Lake Orcadie of northern Scotland.

The scales and plates on its head were covered in a thin layer of spongy, bony material called cosmine. This layer contained canals that were connected to sensory cells deeper in the skin. These canals ended in pores on the surface and were probably for sensing vibrations in the water.

Osteolepis was a rhipidistian, having a number of features in common with the tetrapods (land-dwelling vertebrates and their descendants), and was probably close to the base of the tetrapod family tree.

References

Prehistoric lobe-finned fish genera
Megalichthyiforms
Devonian bony fish
Devonian fish of Europe
Transitional fossils
Taxa named by Louis Agassiz